The John Yardley House, at 210 S. 1st West in Beaver, Utah, was built around 1880.  It was listed on the National Register of Historic Places in 1983.

It is a one-story hall and parlor plan stone house with gable-end chimneys, built of tuff (pink rock).  It has a rear ell which is part of the original, and a hipped roof porch which was added c.1890-1900.  It is overall Classical in style, with a symmetric five-opening front facade, a plain entablature and stylized Tuscan columns.

References

		
National Register of Historic Places in Beaver County, Utah
Houses completed in 1880
Neoclassical architecture in Utah